École nationale d'ingénieurs de Metz (ENI Metz or ENIM) a French engineering College created in 1960.

It is an engineering school oriented towards mechanics and production but which, through the diversity of its training, falls into the category of so-called “generalist” schools.

Located in Metz, the ENIM is a higher public education institution recognised by the State. The school is a member of the Conférence des Grandes Écoles (CGE).

It is one of the Groupe des écoles nationales d'ingénieurs (ENI Group), but also an internal school of the Collegium National Polytechnic Institute of Lorraine (INPL).

Notable alumni 
 Denis Chevrier, a retired Formula One engineer who was the head of engine operations for the Renault F1 team from 2002 to 2007.

References

External links
 ENI Metz

Engineering universities and colleges in France
Grandes écoles
Metz
Educational institutions established in 1960
1960 establishments in France